Ken Gormley may refer to:

 Ken Gormley (musician), Australian musician
 Ken Gormley (academic) (born 1955), American constitutional law professor

See also
John Kenneth Gormley (born 1957), Canadian radio host